Prunella Mary Gee (born 17 February 1950) is an English counsellor, therapist and former actress, best known for her work as an actress in the 1970s and 1980s, and for the role of Doreen Heavey in Coronation Street, a part she first played in 1999. Doreen appeared in 17 episodes before returning as a permanent character in 2002 and 2003. She came back the following year for three episodes, proving to be Gee's final television role.

Early life and education
The daughter of a businessman living in Rutland, Gee was privately educated at Benenden School, where she was in the year below Princess Anne.

Wanting to become an actress, she studied at the London Academy of Music and Dramatic Art, where she won the Spotlight Award for Best Actress in 1972; she then spent six months in repertory performing in works by J. B. Priestley, George Bernard Shaw, William Shakespeare, Georges Feydeau and Joe Orton.

Television and film work
Her first television role was as Anna Fitzgerald in Granada Television's 1930s drama serial Shabby Tiger (1973), in which she rose to overnight notoriety by becoming the first actress to show full frontal nudity on British television. She was quickly hailed as Britain's answer to Brigitte Bardot or Sophia Loren. In a 2002 interview, Gee recalled: "I was working in serious theatre, but got a reputation of being a sex symbol. I was too young to know any better so I tended to go with the flow."

Gee made her film debut in 1975, alongside Sidney Poitier, Michael Caine, and Nicol Williamson, in The Wilby Conspiracy, for which she was nominated Best Newcomer in the Evening News Film Awards. The same year she starred as journalist Sandy Williams in Cover Story, episode 8 of the police drama series The Sweeney.

Throughout the 1970s and 1980s, Gee had guest roles in many television shows, including Return of the Saint, The Glittering Prizes, Hammer House of Horror, The Professionals, and Alas Smith & Jones. She also made regular appearances on the game shows Call My Bluff and Give Us A Clue.

In 1976, Gee starred as Sheila in Waris Hussein's production of Waiting For Sheila for the ITV Sunday Night Drama slot.

She appeared as Del Henney's girlfriend Rebecca Westgate in the second series of the ITV drama serial Fallen Hero in 1979.

In 1981, she starred as Miss Griffin in Nigel Kneale's short-lived LWT sci-fi comedy series Kinvig, alongside Tony Haygarth.

In 1983, she appeared opposite Sean Connery as nurse Patrica Fearing in the James Bond film Never Say Never Again. Other movies throughout the decade included 1985's Number One, where she played a news reporter interviewing Bob Geldof's lead character, and in 1988 she played Sting's wife in Stormy Monday.

In 1985, she appeared as Penelope Keith's disruptive actress sister in the ITV sitcom Moving, and the following year co-starred with Pat Phoenix in Constant Hot Water.

In 1989, she made a guest appearance in the Going Away episode of the ITV comedy series After Henry, and another in the short-lived comedy series, Split Ends, starring Anita Dobson, in a part specially created for her in the episode titled The Brush Off.

In 1998, she played Catherine McKay, a fading adult film star in the romantic comedy film Merchants of Venus, filmed in Los Angeles, in which she starred with Michael York, Beverly D'Angelo and Brian Cox. Although well received by the critics, Merchants of Venus was not made commercially available until 2002, when it was released on DVD.

Gee's last television role was as Doreen Heavey in Coronation Street, the mother of Maxine Peacock and a part she played in regular intervals from 1999 to 2004. The character of Doreen was scatty and flirty, and during her time on the show, had a brief flirtation with Mike Baldwin, a feud with Vera Duckworth, and was a constant source of irritation for her son-in-law Ashley Peacock, when she arrived at his and Maxine's house following a split with her husband Derek, whom she was reconciled with in 2003.

Theatre work
Gee has had a long and varied career on the stage. David Storey cast her in his production of The Farm in 1973, her future husband Ken Campbell gave her the role of the Goddess of Chaos in his acclaimed play Illuminatus in 1976, and in 1988, she played all three women in Last of the Red Hot Lovers.

From 1989 to 1990, she starred as the blind Suzy in a national tour of Wait Until Dark. She took on the double role of Alice in Double Take, at the Liverpool Playhouse in 1990. The same year she devised and starred in Warhola with Snoo Wilson as Warhol (taken from The Philosophy of Andy Warhol) at Offstage and the Carib Theatre, Trinidad. 

From 1991 to 1992, she acted in the play Time and Time Again, which included dates at the Theatre Royal, Bath. 
 Shortly after, she played Romaine in the Agatha Christie play Witness for the Prosecution.

In 1994, she appeared as Kate in William Shakespeare's The Taming of the Shrew, a production which was directed by Val May.

Gee gave up acting in 2004. She briefly returned in 2011 when she appeared in the short film Trimming Pablo.

Post-acting career
Since 2006, she has worked as a counsellor and therapist in Camden, London.

On 13 April 2013, Gee appeared as the very special guest at a 43tv Retro TV Sweeney Meet in Hammersmith, London where she gave an after dinner talk about her career in television and film.

The same month, in her capacity as a counsellor, Gee was interviewed on Jo Good's BBC London 94.9 radio show, talking about addiction. On the programme, Gee revealed that she had given up acting because she had started her training as a counsellor whilst she was by then playing "mums and grannies", and there were not as many acting parts for her. She had tried to do the two together, but realised that she could not give her full attention to both. Gee said that she "bravely" said to her agent: "that's it", and that she wanted to be taken out of Spotlight. She added: "It was the most liberating thing I've ever done".

Personal life

Gee was once in a relationship with Michael Winner. She married the actor and director Ken Campbell in 1978, with whom she had a daughter, Daisy; the couple divorced after five years but remained on good terms.

Television and film

Shabby Tiger (TV 1973) – Anna Fitzgerald
The Wilby Conspiracy (1975) – Rina Van Niekirk
The Sweeney (TV 1975) – Sandy Williams
The Last of the Best Men (TV 1975) – Annette
Quiller (TV 1975) – Diane
The Glittering Prizes (TV 1976) – Carol Richardson
Waiting for Sheila (TV 1976) – Sheila Seathwaite 
Call My Bluff (1977–1980) – Herself
Return of the Saint (TV 1978) – Leila Sabin
Turtle's Progress (TV 1979) – Samantha
Fallen Hero (TV 1979) – Rebecca Westgate
Hammer House of Horror (TV 1980) – Mary Winter
The Professionals (TV 1980) – Sarah Gresham
Kinvig (TV 1981) – Miss Griffin
Cry Freedom (1981) – Susan
Never Say Never Again (1983) – Patricia Fearing
Moving (TV 1985) – Liz Ford
Number One (1985) – Interviewer
Alas Smith & Jones (TV 1985) – Sarah
No Place Like Home (TV 1986) – Abigali
Constant Hot Water (TV 1986) – Miranda Thorpe
Stormy Monday (1988) – Mrs. Finney
Executive Stress (TV 1988) – Valerie Davenport
After Henry (TV 1989) - Alison 
Split Ends (TV 1989) – Jo Thomas
Easy Target (1998) – Wife
Merchants of Venus (1998) – Catherine McKay
Coronation Street (TV 1999–2004) – Doreen Heavey
Trimming Pablo (2011) – Edna

References

External links

1950 births
English film actresses
English soap opera actresses
English television actresses
Living people
Actresses from London
20th-century English actresses
21st-century English actresses